Proletarskaya is a station on the Nevsko-Vasileostrovskaya Line of Saint Petersburg Metro, opened on July 10, 1981.

External links

Saint Petersburg Metro stations
Railway stations in Russia opened in 1981
Railway stations located underground in Russia